St. Louis Place is a neighborhood of St. Louis, Missouri.  It is bounded by Palm Street on the North, Cass Avenue on the South, North Florissant on the East, and North Jefferson on the West.
It is home to National Geospatial-Intelligence Agency's West headquarters

Demographics
In 2020 St. Louis Place's racial makeup was 89.8% Black, 6.3% White, 0.5% Native American, 0.2% Asian, 2.9% Two or More Races, and 0.4% Some Other Race. 1.4% of the population was of Hispanic or Latino origin.

Churches 
Several churches, such as Zion Lutheran, have been active on the north side since the 1800s. Zion Lutheran Church was formed under the Soulard neighborhood's Trinity Lutheran Church in 1860. Its first sanctuary was at Blair and Warren. The second sanctuary of Zion Lutheran Church was completed in 1895. The architect was Albert Knell. The St. Louis Post-Dispatch predicted Zion Lutheran would be the most impressive church in North St. Louis. The construction of the church, which seated 1,280, led to positive changes in the neighborhood, such as sidewalks and a property value increase of 10% in an area that was formerly somewhat vacated. The cornerstone was laid in 1894 and the building was dedicated on December 22, 1895. The altar is made of Italian marble and onyx. Reverend Charles F. Obermeyer introduced English language services in 1897. Other services were given in German. By 1932, most services were in English with one German service each Sunday. A school was built across the street from the church in 1909. A bowling alley was added to the school in 1929. Notable former pastors of Zion Lutheran include Henry Sieck (1886-1889) and his son Louis J. Sieck (assistant pastor 1905; pastor 1914-1943).

See also
St. Louis Place Park

References

Neighborhoods in St. Louis